The 2000 National Soccer League Grand Final was held on 11 June 2000 between Perth Glory and Wollongong Wolves at Subiaco Oval. Perth Glory had gained home-ground advantage as they were the higher ranked team from the regular season, finishing first to the Wolves's third. Perth started the match strong, going 3–0 up in the first half, however Wollongong came back with three second half goals. The scores remained level after extra time, before Wollongong won in a tense penalty shootout. Scott Chipperfield was awarded the Joe Marston Medal. It has been regarded as one of the greatest grand finals of all time.

Route to the final

League Standings

Finals Bracket

Match

Details

References 

2000 in Australian soccer
NSL Grand Finals
Soccer in Perth, Western Australia
Perth Glory FC matches
Wollongong Wolves FC